The Oakville Town Council is the governing body of the Town of Oakville, Ontario, Canada.

The council consists of the mayor plus fourteen elected councillors elected among seven wards. Within each ward, the Town Councillor represents the ward solely in Oakville Town Council, while the Town and Regional Councillor is a member of the governing council of the Regional Municipality of Halton in addition to being a member of the Town Council.

Current Composition (2022-2026)
Elected in the 2022 municipal election

Previous Councils

2018–2022 Council
Elected in the 2018 municipal election

2014–2018 Council

2010–2014 Council

2006-2010 Council

2003-2006 Council

2000-2003 Council

See also
List of mayors of Oakville, Ontario

References

Municipal councils in Ontario
Municipal government of Oakville, Ontario